The Proton Jebat is a series of concept cars developed by Proton, a Malaysian automobile manufacturer, under the joint venture agreement from Mitsubishi Motors. It made its first appearance at the 2010 Kuala Lumpur International Motor Show (KLIMS 2010).

Etymology
The name "Jebat" refers to a legendary warrior from Malacca called Hang Jebat. The car constitutes the Pahlawan series of Proton's concept cars, which are named after such warriors. Additionally, the nameplate has a pronunciation of very close to that of the Malay word, cepat, which means fast in English.

Specifications
It can perform a  acceleration in 5.6 seconds.

See also
Proton Inspira
Mitsubishi Lancer Evolution
Mitsubishi Lancer

References

External links

Proton Holdings Berhad

Jebat
2010s cars
Cars introduced in 2010
Cars powered by transverse 4-cylinder engines